Prof. Šerbo Rastoder, PhD (born 13 August 1956 in Radmanci, Berane, People's Republic of Montenegro, then a part of the SFR Yugoslavia) is a Montenegrin historian of Bosniak ethnicity. He is also an author, writing about the history of Montenegro and about a few specific parts in Montenegro's history. He is a member of the Doclean Academy of Sciences and Arts, Bosniak Academy of Sciences and Arts and Montenegrin Academy of Sciences and Arts.

Šerbo Rastoder is the long-term President of the National Council of Montenegro.

Biography
Šerbo Rastoder was born in Radmance, a region in northern Montenegro encompassing parts of the municipalities of Berane and Bijelo Polje. He completed elementary and high school in Bar. He graduated at the University of Belgrade Faculty of Philosophy in 1981. He competed master (1987) and doctoral (1993) studies at the same institution. He currently works as a professor, teaching in the University of Montenegro, Faculty of Philosophy in Nikšić. He is also a Director and Editor-in-Chief of the Podgorica-based Almanah association. His cousin Rifat Rastoder is a former Deputy Speaker of the Parliament of Montenegro and vice-President of the Social Democratic Party of Montenegro (SDP).

Works
Dr. Nikola Dobrečić, arcibiskup barski I primaš srpski (1872-1955), Život i djelo, Released: 1991 in Budva
Životna Pitanja Crne Gore 1918-1929, Released: 1996 in Bar 
Političke Borbe u Crnoj Gori 1918-1929, Released: 1996 in Belgrade
Skrivana Strana Istorije, Crnogorska Buna i Odmetnički Pokret 1918 - 1929, Parts I - IV, Released: 1997 in Bar 
Političke Stranke u Crnoj Gori 1918-1929, Released: 2000 in Bar
Janušovo Lice Istorije, Released: 2000 in Podgorica
Uloga Francuske u Nasilnoj Aneksiji Crne Gore - Edited by Šerbo Rastoder, Released: 2000 in Bar
Crna Gora u Egzilu, Parts I and II, Released: 2004
History of Montenegro, from Ancient Times to 2003 - co-author (wrote Part II of book), Released: 2006 in Podgorica
Istorijski Leksikon Crne Gore - co-author, Released: 2006

External links
Almanah
Biography at SANOPTIKUM - Culture, Art and Society of Bosniaks of Serbia and Montenegro

References

1956 births
Living people
People from Berane
Bosniaks of Montenegro
Montenegrin Muslims
Montenegrin historians
Montenegrin writers
Montenegrin male writers
Bosniak writers
University of Belgrade Faculty of Philosophy alumni